NumbersUSA is an anti-immigration advocacy organization that seeks to reduce both legal and illegal immigration to the United States. It advocates for immigration reduction through user-generated fax, email, and direct mail campaigns. In November 2022, the organization announced James Massa, a former Cisco executive, as its next chief executive officer following the retirement of founder Roy Beck.

Roy Beck is the founder of the organization, which was conceived by white nationalist John Tanton as the "grassroots arm for the anti-immigrant movement" according to the Southern Poverty Law Center. The Huffington Post reports "NumbersUSA has become something of a bellwether for Republican presidential candidates, who cite the organization's immigration report card to prove they oppose unauthorized immigration."

History 

Beck founded NumbersUSA in 1997 after working as a Washington editor for Tanton's white nationalist journal Social Contract, and considered "heir-apparent" to publisher Social Contract Press, which has been designated a hate group by the Southern Poverty Law Center. NumbersUSA was promoted by co-founder Tanton as the "grassroots arm for the anti-immigrant movement".

In 2004, NumbersUSA reported 50,000 members. In 2007, it claimed 1.5 million members.

In 2007, NumbersUSA was influential in derailing a bipartisan comprehensive immigration bill. The organization's members used information and tools from NumbersUSA to contact legislators and voice opposition.

NumbersUSA Action, which is a 501(c)(4), receives 95 percent of its lobbying budget through member donations of $100 or less. According to tax records from 2013, the single largest donor to NumbersUSA Education and Research Foundation, which is a 501(c)(3), was the Colcom Foundation, which contributed approximately $4.5 million out of an annual budget of $7-10 million.

Ideology and criticism 
Beck's interest in immigration was sparked by his work as a journalist covering the nascent environmental movement in the 1960s, and especially the effect of population growth. Beck says that he started NumbersUSA after he wrote The Case Against Immigration, which was published in 1996. In the course of researching the book he says that he came to see various problems in the US resulting from immigration, which he based on a study of crime in Wausau, Wisconsin.

NumbersUSA founder Roy Beck gained attention via a presentation where he used gumballs to show that immigration to the United States did not alleviate world poverty, because so many remained impoverished outside of the United States. The conclusion was that the United States should restrict immigration more and help the impoverished where they are, instead of allowing them to migrate to richer countries. David R. Henderson, an economist at Stanford University's Hoover Institution and the Naval Postgraduate School in Monterey, California, responded to Beck's video, "By comparing one gumball (one million people) to over 5,000 gumballs (over 5 billion people), he gets his audience thinking that one million people don’t matter because they are such a tiny fraction of 5 billion. But one million people do matter." Henderson also argued, contra Beck's view that allowing immigration is done at a cost to Americans, that "Americans gain from immigration also," and that the net benefit of loosening immigration restrictions would be substantial.

FactCheck.Org have said an advertisement released by NumbersUSA contained "inaccurate, inflated and emotionally charged claims." PolitiFact evaluated as false a NumbersUSA claim that, in an extreme case, the migration of "a single permanent foreign worker could result in the permanent immigration to the United States of 273" relatives through chain migration, noting widespread agreement among experts that such this was "likely impossible under quotas established under current immigration policy".

During the 2016 presidential primaries, NumbersUSA ran an ad that quotes testimony from Barbara Jordan, the renowned Texas Democrat, on a 1996 federal commission that “the commission finds no national interest in continuing to import lesser-skilled and unskilled workers to compete in the most vulnerable parts of our labor force.” However, according to The Washington Post, "Studies have shown that immigrants who arrive legally boost the economy over the long term and that many have higher levels of education than native-born Americans. Commission members said NumbersUSA took Jordan’s words out of context and noted that the commission also proposed accommodating a global waiting list of more than 1 million immigration applicants."

Reception 

The Southern Poverty Law Center (SPLC) describes NumbersUSA as part of a network of "anti-immigration" organizations created by Tanton. A Wall Street Journal Opinion section article also identifies NumbersUSA as one of a half dozen groups founded or funded by Tanton in order to stop immigration and promote population control.

In February 2009, NumbersUSA was called a nativist organization by the Southern Poverty Law Center's report "The Nativist Lobby", though the SPLC also stated that there is no evidence of explicit racism on behalf of Roy Beck or his organization. NumbersUSA firmly denies having any racist or extremist views.

See also 
 Federation for American Immigration Reform

References

External links 
 NumbersUSA Education & Research Foundation

Immigration political advocacy groups in the United States
Non-profit organizations based in Arlington, Virginia
Organizations established in 1997
Population concern organizations